The Women's Army Volunteer Corps was an organization within the Women's Army Corps in which women could serve as office assistants or military bus drivers.

The Corps was formed in 1942 by women employees of the Office of the Military Governor, and numbered 400 personnel.

References

External links
Hawai'i War Records Depository Photographs: Jul-Dec 1942

Branches of the United States Army
American women in World War II
All-female military units and formations
1942 establishments in Hawaii
1945 disestablishments in Hawaii